Samuel Francis Gove (March 9, 1822 – December 3, 1900) was a U.S. Representative from Georgia.

Gove was born in Weymouth, Massachusetts and attended the common schools there. He moved to Georgia in 1835 with his parents, who settled in Twiggs County. He engaged in mercantile and agricultural pursuits. He was also a missionary.

Upon the readmission of the State of Georgia to representation he won a narrow election as a Republican to the Fortieth Congress and served from June 25, 1868, to March 3, 1869. He presented credentials as a Member-elect to the Forty-first Congress, but along with other Georgia representatives, he was not permitted to qualify because he had not been re-elected. Because they were unsure when their representatives would be seated, Georgia decided that the election of April 1868 would fill the seats in the 40th Congress and the 41st Congress. The House ruled that one could not serve in two legislature based on the results of one election.  He was a candidate for Congress again in 1874 and 1876, but lost both races.

He was ordained as a Baptist minister in 1877 and was a traveling missionary from 1879 until his death in St. Augustine, Florida, December 3, 1900. He was interred in Rose Hill Cemetery, Macon, Georgia.

References

1822 births
1900 deaths
Republican Party members of the United States House of Representatives from Georgia (U.S. state)
Baptist missionaries from the United States
Baptist missionaries in the United States
American slave owners
19th-century American politicians
People from Weymouth, Massachusetts
19th-century Baptists